Ostorhinchus flavus, the brassy cardinalfish or yellow cardinalfish, is a species of ray-finned fish from the family Apogonidae, the cardinalfishes. It occurs on the Great Barrier Reef and in the Coral Sea, as well as in the Tasman Sea at Lord Howe Island and at Norfolk Island. The species also occurs in the south-west Pacific.  The males mouthbrood the eggs and the species forms pairs. It is similar in appearance to Ostorhinchus capricornis but this species has two white stripes through its eye rather than neon blue ones.

References

Fish described in 1933
flavus